de Kooning: An American Master is a biography of Dutch American painter Willem de Kooning, a prominent figure in the American movement of abstract expressionism, specially in the 1940s and 1950s. Often compared to Jackson Pollock and Arshile Gorky, de Kooning was considered one of the more inspirational and influential artists of the 20th century. The book, which is the first comprehensive biography presenting both de Kooning's personal life and career, was written by authors by Mark Stevens and Annalyn Swan. In 2005, the book was honored with the 2005 Pulitzer Prize for Biography or Autobiography.

Honors and awards 
 2004 Los Angeles Times Book Prize (Biography)
 2004 National Book Critics Circle Awards
 2005 Pulitzer Prize for Biography or Autobiography
 2005 Ambassador Book Award

References

External links
Presentation by Swan and Stevens on De Kooning: An American Master, March 17, 2005

2004 non-fiction books
Willem de Kooning
Pulitzer Prize for Biography or Autobiography-winning works
Ambassador Book Award-winning works
National Book Critics Circle Award-winning works
Biographies about artists
Abstract expressionism
Alfred A. Knopf books